MCI may refer to:

Organization

Companies
 MCI Communications, originally Microwave Communications Inc., the corporation that operated as MCI from 1963 to 1998
 MCI Inc., formerly called WorldCom, which acquired MCI Communications, and was later acquired by Verizon Communications
 MCI Group, a global event, association management and congress management company
 Mobile Telecommunication Company of Iran, the largest mobile phone operator in Iran
 Motor Coach Industries, a coach/bus manufacturing company
 Music Center Incorporated, later known as Music Consultants Incorporated, a company that manufactured multi-track audiotape recorders and mixing consoles for professional studio recording
 Music Collection International, the music division of Video Collection International
 MCI, Frank Farian's record label

Education
 Maine Central Institute, a boarding school in Maine, US
 Marine Corps Institute, a coursework of Marine Corps education and training programs
 Martingrove Collegiate Institute, a secondary school located in Toronto, Ontario, Canada
 MCI Management Center Innsbruck, a privately organized business school in Innsbruck, Austria
 Mennonite Collegiate Institute, a private, religious school in the town of Gretna, in Southern Manitoba
 Middlefield Collegiate Institute, a secondary school located in Markham, Ontario, Canada
 Museum Conservation Institute, of the Smithsonian Institution

Other organisations
 Medical Council of India, a statutory body regulating medical education in India
 Ministry of Communications and Information, a ministry of the Government of Singapore
 Motek Cultural Initiative, a Toronto-based nonprofit organization promoting Israeli music and culture

Science and technology
 Millicurie (mCi), 1/1000 of a curie, a non-SI unit of radioactivity
 Megacurie (MCi), 1,000,000 times a curie, a non-SI unit of radioactivity
 Macroinvertebrate Community Index, an index where the presence or lack of macroinvertebrates is used for monitoring stream health in New Zealand
 Magnetic current imaging, using a scanning SQUID microscope
 Malicious caller identification, a type of enhanced telephone service
 Mass-casualty incident, a medical emergency involving more patients than can be easily handled by the crews initially assigned to the incident
 Media Control Interface, an API for controlling multimedia peripherals connected to a Microsoft Windows or OS/2 computer
 Meta-circular evaluator, in computing
 Mild cognitive impairment, a neurological affliction often associated with Alzheimer's disease
 Modulation contrast imaging, a term related to optical transfer function

Other uses
 1101 in Roman numerals
 Kansas City International Airport (IATA airport code), Kansas City, Missouri, US
 Meal, Combat, Individual ration, the successor to the US Army C-ration
 Michigan City station (Amtrak station code), Indiana, US
 Miss Chinese International Pageant, an annual pageant for international women of Chinese descent
 Monetary conditions index, a macroeconomic index number relevant for monetary policy
 Short name for Manchester City F.C.